The song "Bohemian Rhapsody", written by Freddie Mercury and originally recorded by rock band Queen for their album A Night at the Opera, has been covered by many different artists.

List

The Braids version

San Francisco Bay Area duo the Braids recorded an R&B version of "Bohemian Rhapsody" for the soundtrack to the Jon Lovitz movie High School High. It was released as their debut single in October 1996 and became a hit in Europe and New Zealand.

Release
The song was produced by Third Eye Blind's lead singer Stephan Jenkins with Eric Valentine and was released as a single in the fall of 1996. It peaked at number 21 in United Kingdom and number 42 on the US Billboard Hot 100, staying on the latter chart for 17 weeks. In New Zealand the song reached number two for four nonconsecutive weeks and achieved Platinum status for sales of over 10,000. In Europe the song was a top-twenty hit in several regions, including Scandinavia, Italy and the Netherlands.

Critical reception
Larry Flick from Billboard described the Braid's version as a "surprisingly potent jeep-funk rendition of the Queen classic", and stated further that "if you let go of everything connected to the original recording and give yourself to this interpretation, you will discover an often poignant street commentary as told from the viewpoint of a young woman." He also added that "the problem is that many may have a difficult time digesting the new concepts tied to this well-worn rocker." Jeremy Helligar from Entertainment Weekly wrote that "stripping ”Bohemian Rhapsody” down to an insistent shuffle beat, assorted piano fills, and soulful vocals, they create a sound so moving that you might want to reach out and hug the speakers." Alan Jones from Music Week deemed it "the most obvious contender" from the High School High soundtrack. He noted that "attacking it from a wholly different angle to Rolf Harris, they give it the kind of makeover that wouldn't disgrace Fugees. Likely to attract a lot of attention." Bönz Malone for Vibe called it a "soaring" remake.

Music video
The music video for "Bohemian Rhapsody" was directed by German director Marcus Nispel.

Track listing

Charts and certifications

Weekly charts

Year-end charts

Certifications

Release history

The Muppets version

The song was performed by The Muppets characters in 2009. A music video was posted on YouTube on November 23, 2009, before the release of the track, and features Muppets characters singing partially modified lyrics of the original song.  It garnered over seven million hits within its first week of release. Unlike other cover versions, the Muppets' single features the final master of Queen's original 1975 recording.

The video and song is an official production of The Muppets Studio. The success of the video caused Walt Disney Records to release the cover as a single on December 13, 2009, where it peaked at #32 on the UK Singles Chart.

Video
The Muppets' version of "Bohemian Rhapsody" was directed by Kirk Thatcher, who has been involved with several other Muppets videos. According to studio manager Lylle Breier, the idea of the Muppets singing "Bohemian Rhapsody" had long been an idea that they wanted to do, but only was able to bring the project together within a short time before the video's release. Thatcher noted they had a long list of possible songs they wanted to do with a large group of Muppets, including Don McLean's "American Pie", but "Bohemian Rhapsody" was their ultimate selection. Filming was completed within a day by 20 staffers; Thatcher considered the task to be "epic in scale" considering they normally only use half a dozen Muppets for a single scene. Breier stated that this and other videos that The Muppets Studio released to YouTube are part of a promotional push for the Muppets; Breier likened outlets on the Internet like YouTube to the variety shows of the 1970s, and felt that the Muppets easily fit into that culture.

The video is a montage by about 70 different Muppets characters singing their part of the lyrics against a black screen, in the same style used by Queen for portions of their promotion video of the song as well as mimicking the four-person layout used for the cover of Queen's second album. After completing the song, which ends up with mosaic of all the characters singing, it is revealed that this was one side of a computer video conference with Kermit the Frog, who laments his decision for that type of meeting to Scooter.

The video presents an abridged version of Queen's song with some lyric alterations to retain the appropriateness of the characters for a family audience. For example, within the first stanza of the ballad portion of the song, the lyrics where the singer laments to his mother that he "just killed a man" are replaced by Animal calling out repeatedly for "mama". Other aspects of the lyrics are changed for humorous purposes surrounding the Muppets characters. Pepe the King Prawn starts the opera portion of the song stating that he sees "a little silhouetto of a clam". The back-and-forth lyrics, "Bismillah! No! We will not let you go...let him go!", are replaced with Fozzie Bear begging "Let me joke" to Statler and Waldorf, who state "[We] do not like your jokes". The line "Beelzebub has a devil put aside for me" is replaced with the remaining Muppets who have not been in the video singing "Does anyone know if there is a part for me?" The first two lines of the hard rock section, here performed by Dr. Teeth and The Electric Mayhem, have been replaced with "So they tell us this video's going to fly, all I know is we're not getting paid tonight!" The song ends with Miss Piggy, lounging on Rowlf the Dog's piano, singing "Nothing really matters but moi!"

The video premiered on YouTube on November 23, 2009. Within a week, the video had accrued over 7 million views, and has nearly 15 million views within the following five months. The video was nominated and won the "Viral Video" category in the 14th Annual Webby Awards. The popularity of the video led to the song being distributed through digital download on iTunes in December by Walt Disney Records and EMI. The song reached #32 on the UK Singles Chart for the week of December 26, 2009. For New Year's Eve at Disneyland, the video was projected onto the Fantasmic! mist screens in-between performances, and in place of an extra midnight performance. The performance also utilized the show's various laser effects and lighting towers working in tandem with the video.

Queen personnel
Freddie Mercury — piano, occasional backing vocals
Brian May — electric guitar
Roger Taylor — drums, percussion
John Deacon — bass guitar

Muppet performers
Steve Whitmire — Kermit the Frog, Rizzo the Rat, Beaker, Statler, The Newsman, Chicken, Bunny, Penguin, Snowth, Turkey, Flowers, Cactus, Monkey 
Dave Goelz — The Great Gonzo, Dr. Bunsen Honeydew, Waldorf, Zoot, Beauregard, Frackle, Penguins, Rat, Cactus, Monkey 
Eric Jacobson — Miss Piggy, Fozzie Bear, Animal, Sam the Eagle, Snowth, Chicken, Frackle, Penguin, Prairie Dog
Bill Barretta — Pepé the King Prawn, Rowlf the Dog, Dr. Teeth, Swedish Chef, Old Tom, Bobo the Bear, Johnny Fiama, Mahna Mahna, Big Mean Carl, Rat, Flowers, Cactus, Monkey, Prairie Dog
David Rudman — Scooter, Janice, Yolanda the Rat, Rat, Penguins, Monkey, Prairie Dog
Matt Vogel — Camilla the Chicken, Floyd Pepper, Angel Marie, Crazy Harry, Sal Minella, Dr. Julius Strangepork, Lew Zealand, Rat, Flowers, Cactus, Monkey, Prairie Dog

Panic! at the Disco version

American band Panic! at the Disco covered the song as part of their set list for several concert tours, including The Gospel Tour, Summer Tour 2016, the Death of a Bachelor Tour, and the Pray for the Wicked Tour. The song was officially recorded for Suicide Squad: The Album (2016), the soundtrack album for the 2016 film, and premiered on 4 August 2016 on the Beats 1 radio station. In addition, a recording of the song performed on tour was included on the track listing of the live album All My Friends We're Glorious (2017). The band performed "Bohemian Rhapsody" at the Qudos Bank Arena in Sydney, Australia, during the American Music Awards of 2018 in promotion of the 2018 biopic. The cover was certified gold by the Recording Industry Association of America on 12 June 2018.

Weekly charts

Year-end charts

Certifications

References

Further reading

External links 
 
"Bohemian Rhapsody" cover versions BBC
 
Marimba performance of Bohemian rhapsody on YouTube
European Space-ody, hommage to both Queen and spaceflight including a Brian May cameo on YouTube

Bohemian Rhapsody
Bohemian Rhapsody